The pearl danio (Danio albolineatus) is a tropical fish belonging to the minnow family Cyprinidae. Originating in Sumatra, Myanmar, and Thailand, this fish is sometimes found in aquariums by fish-keeping hobbyists. It grows to a maximum length of 2.6 inches (6.5 cm) and lives for around five years. The fish could have a brownish-yellow, pink, or a silver body and two light yellow/white or blue/red stripes. It has an iridescent look. The female fish has two pairs of barbels.

In the wild, the pearl danio is found in along the surface of small, clear rivers and hill streams. They live in a tropical climate with water with a 6.0 – 8.0 pH, a water hardness of up to 5 – 19 dGH, and a temperature range of 68–77 °F (20–25 °C). Their diet consists mostly of exogenous insects and zooplankton. The pearl danio is an egglayer. Golden varieties are often seen in shops; these are in reality semi-albino fish. The blue-redstripe danio (D. a. var. pulcher) and the Kedah danio (D. a. var. tweediei) were considered distinct, but most taxonomic authorities consider them to be varieties of the pearl danio.

References

Danio
Fish of Southeast Asia
Fish of Thailand
Fish described in 1860
Taxa named by Edward Blyth